Seyed Mohammad Mehdi Seyed-Salehi, (more commonly known as Mehdi Seyed-Salehi, born July 27, 1981, in Iran) is a former Iranian football player. He usually played as a striker.

Club career

Persepolis
He signed a two-year contract with Tehran's reds until end of 2013–14 Season. He scored his first goal in his debut match against Tractor.

Club career statistics

 Assist Goals

International career

He was a member of Iran national under-23 football team in its unsuccessful qualification campaign for Athens 2004.

He made his debut for Iran national football team in October 2008, coming in as a substitute against North Korea national football team. He scored his first goal in a friendly match against China in Oman from the penalty kick.

Honours

Club
Sepahan
AFC Champions League: 2007 (Runner-up)
Iran Pro League: 2002–03, 2007–08 (Runner-up), 2011–12
Hazfi Cup: 2003–04, 2005–06, 2006–07

Esteghlal
Iran Pro League: 2010–11 (Runner-up)

Tractor
Iran Pro League: 2012–13 (Runner-up)

Persepolis
Iran Pro League: 2013–14 (Runner-up)

References

1981 births
Living people
Iranian footballers
Iran international footballers
Persian Gulf Pro League players
Rah Ahan players
Sepahan S.C. footballers
Paykan F.C. players
Esteghlal F.C. players
Tractor S.C. players
Persepolis F.C. players
Saipa F.C. players
Esteghlal Khuzestan players
Gostaresh Foulad F.C. players
Association football forwards